Goalball is a team sport designed specifically for athletes with a vision impairment.  Australia commenced its involvement in the sport in 1980.  Its women's team has completed in trans-Tasman competitions, the IBSA World Goalball Championships, and the Paralympic Games.

About 2015, the women's squad adopted the name 'Aussie Belles', whilst the men's squad became 'Aussie Storm'.

Training

In 1998 and 1999, the University of Western Sydney's Macarthur Department of Sport Studies was active in helping the team develop and implement a training program.  This training was implemented around Geoff Pearce and Oatsy Tremayne's book Psychological and Physical Training Programs of Goalballers.

Paralympic Games

1996 Atlanta 

The women's Australian team did not have as much experience as other teams in the 1996 Paralympics. European teams had competed against each other in the lead up to the games.  This gave them an advantage as they knew their opponents strengths and weaknesses. The Australian women had several injuries during the Paralympics. Sarah Kennedy injured herself in training, which limited her mobility. Australia lost all but one match in 1996.  They lost to Spain 0–1, to Sweden 0–4, to Denmark 1–5, to Germany 0–2 and to the USA 0–3.  Australia's sole victory came against Korea, where they won 2–0.  Australia finished as the last team in the competition based on goals for and against as they had a record of 3–16.  The 0–1 loss to Finland was considered impressive by goalball followers because Finland won a silver medal.

2000 Sydney 
Paralympian athletes: Penny Bennett, Kerrie-ann King, Jo Ruba, Robyn Stephens. 
Officials: Terry Kenaghan (head coach).

The women's team finished eighth.

2004 Athens 

Australia did not qualify.

2008 Beijing 

Australia did not qualify.

2012 London 

Paralympian athletes: Jennifer Blow, Meica Christensen (Captain), Tyan Taylor, Nicole Esdaile, Rachel Henderson, Michelle Rzepecki. 
Officials: Peter Corr (section manager), Georgina Kenaghan (coach), Eliza Kwan (physiotherapist).

The team went into the Games ranked eighth in the world and was the first Australian goalball team to qualify for the Paralympic sport since Atlanta in 1996. It competed in Group B against China, United States, Sweden, Japan and Canada. The Australian men's team did not qualify after losing the Africa Oceania Goalball Regional Championships 5–4 against Algeria.

Results

Group play

2016 Rio 

Paralympian athletes: Jennifer Blow, Nicole Esdaile, Meica Horsburgh, Raissa Martin, Michelle Rzepecki, Tyan Taylor. 
Officials: Peter Corr (coach), Robert Vogt (team leader).

Australian women's team originally failed to qualify after finishing third at the IBSA Goalball Asia Pacific Championships in Hangzhou, China.[15] Australian men's team failed to qualify after finishing fifth at the IBSA Goalball Asia Pacific Championships in Hangzhou, China.[16] Following the re-allocation of Russia's spot due to their disqualification, Australia's women found themselves getting a last minute invite to Rio.  Australia's women enter the tournament ranked ninth in the world.[17]

Results

2020 Tokyo 

Paralympian athletes: Jennifer Blow, Meica Horsburgh, Raissa Martin, Amy Ridley, Brodie Smith, Tyan Taylor. 
Officials: Peter Corr (coach), Simon Smith (assistant coach).

Australian women's team qualified by coming fourth at the 2019 IBSA Goalball Paralympic Ranking Tournament at Fort Wayne, USA.

Round-robin

 Quarter-finals

World championships

1986 Roermond 

The 1986 IBSA World Goalball Championships were held in Roermond, the Netherlands. The team was one of ten teams participating, and they finished eighth overall. The 1998 World Championships were held in Madrid, Spain.  The team was one of eleven teams participating, and they finished tenth overall.

1998 Madrid 

The national team finished tenth at the 1998 IBSA World Goalball Championships held in Madrid, Spain.

2006 Spartanburg  

The team competed in the 2006 World Championships, in July 2006, in Spartanburg, South Carolina, United States of America.

2010 Sheffield 

The Australian women's national goalball team had a top eight finish at the 2010 World Championships in Sheffield, England. The national team had not played in an international competition for two years starting around 2008 until the 2010 Championships.

2014 Espoo  

The team competed in the 2014 World Championships from 30 June to 5 July 2014, in Espoo, Finland.  In Pool Y, they did not make the quarter finals.  In their five games, they lost to Brazil 5:9, Israel 2:6, China 1:2, Ukraine 2:7, but beat Sweden 4:1.

2018 Malmö 

Athletes for the event were: Jennifer Blow, Meica Christensen, Nikita Grosser (South Australia), Alison Jones (Queensland), Michelle Rzepecki, and Brodie Smith (New South Wales).  Head coach was Peter Corr (Victoria), assistant coach and manager Simon Smith (New South Wales), and sports masseuse Kerri Caruso.  In Pool C, they ranked fourth, lost to Brazil 2:5 in the quarter finals, coming eighth in overall standings.

2022 Matosinhos 

The team competed in the 2022 World Championships from 7 to 16 December 2022, at the Centro de Desportos e Congressos de Matosinhos, Portugal.  There were sixteen men's and sixteen women's teams.  They placed sixth in Pool B, and eleventh in final standings.

Regional championships 

The team competed in IBSA Oceania goalball region, and from January 2010 became part of the IBSA Asia-Pacific goalball competition region.

2011 Sydney  

The team competed in a composite tournament, the 2011 IBSA African-Oceania Regional Championships, with games from 15 to 17 November 2011, at the Sydney Olympic Park Sports Centre, Sydney, Australia.    Although the four regions under the rules were Africa, America, Asia/Pacific, and Europe, as there were insufficient competitive teams in both Africa and Oceania regions, IBSA agreed to combined championships.  For the women's teams, it was only Australia versus New Zealand, the winner qualifying for the London 2012 Paralympic Games.  From the best of three games, Australia dominated and qualified.

2013 Beijing  

The team competed in the 2013 IBSA Asia Pacific Goalball Regional Championships, from 11 to 16 November 2013, in Beijing, China.  Of the four women's teams (Australia, China, Iran, Japan), Australia won one game, drew two, and lost three, to finish in fourth position.

2015 Hangzhou  

The team competed in the 2015 IBSA Asia Pacific Goalball Regional Championships, from 8 to 12 November 2015, in the China National Goalball Training Centre, Hangzhou, China.  Of the five women's teams (Australia, China, Japan, Mongolia, Thailand), the team took the bronze medal.

2017 Bangkok  

The team competed in the 2017 IBSA Asia/Pacific Goalball Regional Championships, from Monday 21 to Saturday 26 August 2017, in the  Thai-Japan Sports Stadium, Din Daeng, Bangkok, Thailand.  The team lost the bronze medal match to South Korea, 2:10.

2019 Chiba  

The team competed in the 2019 IBSA Goalball Asia-Pacific Regional Championships, from Thursday 5 to Tuesday 10 December 2019, in the Chiba Port Arena, Chiba, Japan. They placed fourth overall.

2022 Bahrain  

Due to the COVID-19 pandemic, the 2021 IBSA Goalball Asia-Pacific Regional Championships were moved from November 2021 to 21 March 2022 in Asan, South Korea.  The championships was finally held at the Bahrain Sports Federation for Disabilities Sports Centre, in Riffa, Bahrain from Monday 25 July 2022 to Friday 29 July 2022.  The top two teams of each division are eligible for the World Championships in December 2022.

There were four women's teams: Australia, Iran, South Korea, Thailand.  They placed third in the round-robin, and second overall.  The team beat Iran in the semi-finals 7:1, but were beaten by South Korea in the finals 7:2.

Competitive history 

The table below contains some individual game results for the team in international matches and competitions.

Goal scoring by competition

Gallery

See also

 Australia men's national goalball team
 Australia at the Paralympics
 Parasports

References

Bibliography

 
 
 

National women's goalball teams
Australia women's national goalball team
Australian Paralympic teams
Goalball in Australia
Goalball in Asia